This is a list of structural failures and collapses, including bridges, dams, and radio masts/towers.

Buildings and other fixed human-made structures

Antiquity to the Middle Ages

17th–19th centuries

1900–1949

1950-1979

1980–2000

2000–2009

2010–2019

2020–present

See also
List of aircraft structural failures
List of bridge failures
List of dam failures
List of catastrophic collapses of broadcast masts and towers

References

External links
These Are Some Of The Worst Architectural Disasters in History
Near-misses and failure part 1
Near-misses and failure part 2
How to Avoid Catastrophe

Engineering failures
History of structural engineering
Structural